The 2017 season of Clube Desportivo Primeiro de Agosto is the club's 39th season in the Girabola, the Angolan Premier football League and 39th consecutive season in the top flight of Angolan football. In 2017,  the club participated in the Supercup, the Girabola, the Angola Cup and the 2017 CAF Champions League.

Squad information

Players

Staff

Pre-season transfers

Mid-season transfers

Overview

Angola Super Cup

Angolan League

League table

Results

Results summary

Results by round

Match Details

CAF Champions League

Preliminary round

Angola Cup

Results

Preliminary round

Round of 16

Quarter-finals

Semi-finals

Final

Season statistics

Total results

Appearances and goals

|-
! colspan="14" style="background:#DCDCDC; text-align:center" | Goalkeepers

|-
! colspan="14" style="background:#DCDCDC; text-align:center" | Defenders

|-
! colspan="14" style="background:#DCDCDC; text-align:center" | Midfielders

|-
! colspan="14" style="background:#DCDCDC; text-align:center" | Forwards

|-
! colspan="14" style="background:#DCDCDC; text-align:center" | Opponents

|-
! colspan="14" style="background:#DCDCDC; text-align:center" | Total
|- align=center
| colspan="4"| Total ||451(113) || 60 || 330(81) || 44 || 88(23) || 13 || 11(3) || 1 || 22(6) || 2

Scorers

Clean sheets

See also
 List of C.D. Primeiro de Agosto players

External links
 Facebook profile
 Zerozero.pt profile
 Match details

References

C.D. Primeiro de Agosto seasons
Primeiro de Agosto